The FAMAE FT-2000 is a double-action, .38 Special, solid frame revolver produced in Chile.  A slightly smaller variant is produced in .32 Long Colt.

References

External links
 
 FT-2000 at Securityarms

FAMAE
Revolvers
Weapons of Chile
Police weapons